WELD-FM is a Country formatted broadcast radio station licensed to Moorefield, West Virginia, serving the Potomac Highlands of West Virginia.  WELD-FM is owned and operated by Thunder Associates, LLC.

Translator
In addition to the main station, WELD-FM is relayed by an FM translator to widen its broadcast area.

References

External links
 FM101.7 WELD Online
 

1998 establishments in West Virginia
Country radio stations in the United States
Radio stations established in 1987
ELD-FM